San Pablo may refer to places in Costa Rica:

San Pablo, Heredia Province
San Pablo, Turrubares Canton in San José Province
San Pablo, Leon Cortés Canton in San José Province